Floor is the debut studio album by American sludge metal band Floor released in 2002 on the No Idea Records label. After recording EPs and demos over an approximate ten-year period in an attempt to capture the doom-pop sound they have become known for, the bands use of providing the biggest possible sound with minimal guitar work finally paid off. Giving it a positive rating, AllMusic's Gregory Heaney said of the album "...though the riffs here feel, at times, Sunn O)))-like, the thunderous drums help the whole package feel propulsive rather than ponderous."

In May 2013, Floor was inducted into Decibel Magazine’s Hall of Fame.

Track listing

Personnel
Floor
 Steve Brooks – guitar and vocals
 Anthony Vialon – guitar
 Henry Wilson – drums and bass guitar

Additional musicians and technical personnel
 Ken Karg, Lisa Bugayong – additional vocals 
 Mark Nikolich – recording and engineering
 Sean Mahan – artwork 
 Sean Deren - photography
 Var Thelin - graphics

References

2002 debut albums
No Idea Records albums
Floor (band) albums